Taiwanese beef noodle soup is a beef noodle soup dish that originated in Taiwan. It is sometimes referred to as "Sichuan beef noodle soup" in Taiwan, although this usage can create confusion as Sichuan has its own versions of beef noodle soups. which may be sold at Sichuanese restaurants under the same name. The beef is often stewed with the broth and simmered, sometimes for hours. Chefs also let the stock simmer for long periods with bone marrow; some vendors can cook the beef stock for over 24 hours. In Taiwan, beef noodle vendors may also have optional, often cold side dishes, such as braised dried tofu, seaweed or pork intestine. Beef noodles are often served with suan cai (Chinese pickled cabbage or mustard) on top, green onion and sometimes other vegetables in the soup as well.

The dish was created in Taiwan by Kuomintang veterans from Sichuan province who fled from mainland China to Kaohsiung, Taiwan, and served the dish in military dependents' villages. The Taiwanese traditionally had an aversion to the consumption of beef even into the mid-1970s because cattle were valuable beasts of burden, so originally the dish was only eaten by waishengren. However, the dish became more accepted over time and is now one of the most famous dishes in Taiwanese cuisine. It is believed that the popularity of this noodle soup broke the beef-eating taboo and also paved the way to Taiwan's acceptance of American foods that utilized beef (such as hamburgers). The Taiwanese Beef Noodle Soup is significantly less spicy than Sichuan flavors, and there are several variations with the soy-based broth, such as tomato, garlic and herbal medicine. The tomato variation is popular in Taiwan and features chunks of tomatoes in a rich red-coloured tomato broth with or without soy sauce. The herbal medicine variation is usually served without suan cai as a topping (as its acidic properties are believed to exhibit medicinal properties) and may be accompanied by a chili paste made from beef lard.

Taiwanese beef noodle soups are sometimes served as fast food in both Taiwan and mainland China. In China, Mr. Lee is the largest chain, featuring the dish "California Beef Noodle Soup".  In Taiwan, Mercuries Beef Noodle (sān shāng qiǎo fú, see :zh:三商巧福) is the largest beef noodle fast food franchise, owned by a subsidiary of Mercuries & Associates Holdings (:zh:三商企業). It is sometimes considered a national dish in Taiwan, and every year Taipei holds an annual Beef Noodle Festival, where various chefs and restaurants compete for the title of the "best beef noodles in Taiwan". Due to influences from the influx of immigrants from mainland China in the early 1900s, the Taiwanese version of beef noodle soup is now one of the most popular dishes in Taiwan.

See also
 Beef noodle soup
 List of noodle dishes
 List of soups
 Pho
 Ramen
 Taiwanese cuisine

References

Beef dishes
National dishes
Noodle soups
Taiwanese cuisine
Taiwanese noodle dishes